Meshach Chambers (23 December 1867 – 23 June 1920) was an English cricketer who played for Nottinghamshire. He was born in Awsworth and died in Newcastle-upon-Tyne.

Chambers made a single first-class appearance for the team, playing in Nottinghamshire's first ever first-class match in 1894. He scored just six runs in the two innings in which he played, and bowled 21 overs, taking one wicket.

External links
Meshach Chambers at CricketArchive 

1867 births
1920 deaths
English cricketers
Nottinghamshire cricketers
Northumberland cricketers
People from the Borough of Broxtowe
Cricketers from Nottinghamshire